Open House is a 2000 novel by U.S. author Elizabeth Berg.  It was an Oprah's Book Club selection in 2000.

Plot summary

Throughout the 20 years of her marriage, Samantha Morrow has been content with her life, though she knows it isn't perfect. She has a nice home, a great son, and a husband she loves. But everything is turned upside down when her husband, David, tells her he wants out of their marriage. His rapid departure on the heels of this announcement leaves Sam horribly shocked, utterly confused, and oddly obsessed with Martha Stewart. Her initial reaction is to go on a spending spree, charging thousands of dollars worth of merchandise at Tiffany's to her husband's credit card. But when reality sets in and her husband cuts her off, she realizes that if she wants to keep the house she loves and make a home for herself and her son, she's going to have to generate some income.

Her first solution to this dilemma is to find a couple of roommates. Between the finished portion of the basement and the extra bedroom upstairs, Sam figures she can take on two boarders and mitigate a large portion of the mortgage payment. She finds her first boarder quickly—the septuagenarian mother of an acquaintance—and is delighted. Lydia Fitch is quiet, clean, concerned, friendly, and more than eager to play grandmother to Sam's son, Travis. Which is just as well, since Sam's own mother doesn't quite fit the bill. In fact, Sam's mother has made a career out of dating since the death of her husband two decades ago and is now determined to fix Sam up as soon as possible—a plan with foreseeable disasters written all over it.

Sam's life is further complicated when she starts looking for a job, for other than a gig singing in a band years ago, she's never been employed. But then King, the gentle giant of a man who helps Lydia move in, puts Sam in touch with the employment agency he works for. Suddenly Sam is off on a variety of short-term jobs, everything from making change at a Laundromat, to working as a carpenter's helper. When she gets the devastating news that Lydia has decided to marry her longtime beau and move out, Sam takes on a second boarder for the basement space: a sullen, depressed college student.

Film adaptation
Based on a best-seller by Elizabeth Berg, this made-for-TV movie stars Christine Lahti as Samantha Morrow, a middle-class mom deserted by her shallow husband, David (Chris Potter). In order to keep a roof over her head—not to mention the head of her son, Travis (Mark Rendall) -- Samantha decides to take in boarders. Among these is a runaway teenager named Lavender Blue (Grace Lynn Kung) and a chubby working stiff named King (Daniel Baldwin). Also on hand are Samantha's down-to-earth mom (Eva Marie Saint) and cable-TV home-design expert Colin Cowie (as himself).

2000 American novels